Rubinar is a Soviet lens design series developed and produced by JSC Lytkarino Plant of Optical Glass (LZOS). It is compact despite its long focal lengths.

Rubinars can be used with proprietary mount cameras by using M42 adaptors. Focusing motors are absent though (manual only), and so are the variable apertures.

Variants 

 MC Rubinar - 1:8.0 500 mm
 MC Rubinar - 1:4.5 300 mm
 MC Rubinar - 1:5.6 500 mm
 MC Rubinar - 1:10 1000 mm
 Rubinars may be transformed into spotting scopes using an M42 Turist-FL ocular attachment and image redresser. Their optical arrangement gives flexibility in placing the focal plane and changing the focal ratio by mere refocus.
 Astro-Rubinar is a Rubinar 1000 mm kit including oculars and a 90° prism for convenient use as a visual telescope.
 MTO lenses by Soviet manufacturer KMZ utilise a similar design, with a single Maksutov achromatic corrector.

References

External links 

 LZOS website
  MC Rubinar - 1:8.0 500 mm MACRO
 MTO-11CA 10/1000 Telephoto Lens on LZOS website
 Communist Cameras

Soviet photographic lenses
Mirror lenses